Jaadugar is a 2022 Indian Hindi-language sports drama film directed by Sameer Saxena and written by Biswapati Sarkar and produced under the banner of the new established Production company Posham Pa Pictures. The film features Jitendra Kumar and Arushi Sharma in the lead role, alongside Jaaved Jaaferi.

Premise 
In a small football-loving town Neemuch in Madhya Pradesh, a small-time magician, Magic Meenu who has no athletic skill must help his team win a football trophy to marry his love interest, but the problem is that his team hasn't won a game in many years.

Cast 

 Jitendra Kumar as Meenu Narang
 Arushi Sharma as Disha Chhabra
 Javed Jaffrey as Pradeep Narang
 Manoj Joshi as magician Chhabra, Disha's father
 Raj Qushal as Lalli
 Raksha Pannwar as Dipa
 Shoan Zagade as Riju George
 Sandeep Shikhar as Ramswaroop
 Rajiv Nema as Nema
 Sameer Saxena as Doshi
 Rukshar Dhillon as Iccha
 Purnendu Bhattacharya as Avinash
 Dhruv Thukral as Shekhawat
 Shayank shukla as Hemu

Production 
The official announcement of the film was made in March 2021 from Netflix India YouTube channel.

Release 
The film was released worldwide on 15 July 2022 via Netflix in Hindi and dubbed versions in English, Tamil and Telugu.

References

External links 

 

2022 films
2022 drama films
Hindi-language Netflix original films
Films set in Madhya Pradesh